Esperanza del corazón (English title: Hoping Heart) is a Spanish-language Mexican telenovela produced by Luis de Llano Macedo for Televisa. It aired on Canal de las Estrellas from July 18, 2011 to February 3, 2012. It is a merger of Aguetas de Color de Rosa and Confidente de Secundaria, produced by Luis de Llano Macedo in 1994 and 1996, respectively.

Bianca Marroquín, Agustín Arana and Patricio Borghetti starred as protagonists, while Lucía Méndez, Lisardo and Carmen Aub starred as antagonists. Marisol del Olmo, Thelma Madrigal and Mané de la Parra starred as stellar performances.

In the United States, Univision aired Esperanza del Corazón from September 6, 2011 to March 23, 2012.

Plot
It is the story of Ángela, who supported by her daughter Lisa, struggle to move on and overcome all the adversities that life presents them. After the death of her husband Franco, Ángela suffers the abuse and batter of her mother-in-law, Lucrecia, who withdraws her support and kicks her out of the house.

However, Ángela remains enthusiastic, and she will face the difficulties with dignity and fortitude.  When she married Franco, Ángela put aside her humble origins and her career as a ballet dancer in order to mingle with high-class people. In spite of this, she never lost her naturalness nor stopped fighting to keep her family together.

When Franco dies and she becomes a widow, Ángela is forced to move into a popular neighborhood, where she will live together with low-class people, some of them hopeless, to whom she will transmit the joy of life and the love for the dance. Here, she will meet Mariano, a gorgeous and handsome ecologist, who will end up captivating her. Mariano has a son, Alexis, who is the pop-star of the moment and with whom Lisa and Krista will fall in love.

We will also meet Silvestre, Lucrecia’s butler, who lives in the “La Esperanza” development with his wife, a crazy, gossipy and sensual woman named Gladis, with whom he has 3 children: Brandon, Abril and Britni. The 3 siblings love each other but are and look completely different, which will lead us to discover some obscure secrets of the past that relate them to the Dupris family.

All of these characters and their own stories will provide us of a particular magic, where the main ingredients are love, the struggle between good and evil, the fight for keeping up with principles and finding the right way to defeat the villains, always with the perfect hint of tears, laughter and music.

Cast

Main 

 Lucía Méndez as Lucrecia Dávila Viuda de Duprís
 Fernando Allende as Orlando Duarte
 Bianca Marroquín as Ángela Landa de Duprís
 Patricio Borghetti as Mariano Duarte
 Marisol del Olmo as Lorenza Duprís Dávila de Cabral
 Agustín Arana as Franco Duprís Dávila
 Lisardo as Aldo Cabral
 Juan Carlos Barreto as Silvestre Figueroa
 Alejandra Ávalos as Gladys Guzmán
 Mané de la Parra as Alexis Duarte Moreno
 Julissa as Greta Lascuraín Rivadeneyra
 Carmen Aub as Krista Cabral Duprís
 Tania Vázquez as Camila Moreno
 Bárbara Torres as Bobbie
 Laureano Brizuela as Laureano
 Alejandro Speitzer as Diego Duprís Landa
 Samadhi as Abril Figueroa Duprís
 Mariana Botas as Britney Figueroa Guzmán

Recurring 
 Jesús Zavala as Hugo Martínez "Wampi"
 Thelma Madrigal as Lisa Duprís Landa / Mónica
 Marco de Paula as Leonardo
 Fernanda Arozqueta as Alejandra
 Lilia Aragón as La Tocha
 Emmanuel Orenday as Brandon Figueroa Guzmán
 Gabriela Zamora as Rubí
 Karyme Hernández as Alma "Almita" Duprís Landa
 Rodrigo Llamas as El Muñe
 Sofía Castro as Eglantina
 Sussan Taunton as Karyme (Eglantina's mother)

Special guest stars 
 Sandra Echeverría as Herself

Awards

TVyNovelas Awards

Bravo Awards

References

2011 telenovelas
2011 Mexican television series debuts
2012 Mexican television series endings
Spanish-language telenovelas
Television shows set in Mexico City
Mexican telenovelas
Televisa telenovelas